Joinville-Lauro Carneiro de Loyola Airport  is the airport serving Joinville, Brazil. It is named after a local entrepreneur and politician.

It is operated by CCR.

History
The new terminal building was commissioned on March 8, 2004.

Previously operated by Infraero, on April 7, 2021 CCR won a 30-year concession to operate the airport.

Airlines and destinations

Accidents and incidents
13 September 1996: a Helisul Embraer EMB 110 Bandeirante registration PT-WAV operating a cargo flight from Porto Alegre to Joinville collided with a hill and crashed during final approach to land at Joinville. The crew of two died.

Access

See also

List of airports in Brazil

References

External links

Airports in Santa Catarina (state)
Airport Lauro Carneiro De Loyola